Kavimba is a village in North-West District of Botswana. It is located in the eastern part of the district, which before 2001 formed Chobe District, and has a primary school and no secondary school . The population was 519 in 2001 census.

References

North-West District (Botswana)
Villages in Botswana